In the United Kingdom, the term public inquiry refers to either statutory or non-statutory inquiries that have been established either previously by the Monarch or by government ministers of the United Kingdom, Scottish, Northern Irish and Welsh governments to investigate either specific, controversial events or policy proposals. Non-statutory public inquiries are often used in order to investigate controversial events of national concern, the advantage being that they are more flexible than the statutory inquiry as they do not needing to follow the requirements of the Inquiries Act 2005, The Inquiry Rules 2006 (UK, excluding Scotland) and The Inquiries (Scotland) Rules 2007. Statutory inquiries can be held as subject-specific public inquiries, however most are now held under the Inquiries Act 2005 which repealed the Tribunals of Inquiry (Evidence) Act 1921. This list excludes Public Local Inquiries (which encompasses Planning Inquiries, Compulsory Purchase Order Inquiries, Listed Building Inquiries etc.)

Only United Kingdom government ministers can establish public inquiries, set their terms of reference, and appoint the chair. The UK Government considers that the main purpose of public inquiries is in “preventing recurrence”.  Between 1990 and 2017 UK governments spent at least £630m on public inquiries, with most expensive being the Bloody Sunday Inquiry costing £210.6 million.  Most public inquiries take about two years to complete their work. The Hammond Inquiry into ministerial conduct relating to the Hinduja affair in 2001 has been the shortest inquiry, taking just 45 days to report its findings. The Inquiry into Hyponatraemia-related Deaths in Northern Ireland is the longest, which took 13 years and three months to conclude.

Types of public inquiry
There are two types of public inquiry, the statutory inquiry and the non-statutory inquiry. Statutory public inquiries are led by a panel of professional people with a chairperson, which are often judges, or a lord, professor, senior civil servant, scientist, doctor or engineer. The big difference between the two types of public inquiries is that the non-statutory inquiry cannot compel witnesses to either give evidence under oath or to produce evidence relevant to the inquiry.

There are four types of non-statutory inquiries:

Non-statutory 'ad-hoc' inquiries, including independent panels, 
Royal Commissions,
Committees of Privy Counsellors, and
Departmental inquiries.

Public inquiries in the UK have historically been widely used, especially royal commissions. Royal commissions were used so that the monarch could obtain advice and inquire into matters and misconduct outside of institutions, such as parliament. The first royal commission goes back to William the Conqueror in the 11th century, when he nominated an inquiry to produce the Domesday Book of land ownership. Royal commissions were later appointed by governments to obtain expert advice on subjects such as health, education, labour reform, public administration, welfare and factory legislation.

 Subject-specific public inquiries
Subject-specific public inquiries are sections held within other acts of Parliament which also have the powers of statutory public inquiries, these include;
section 3 of the Children Act 2004, carried out by the Children's Commissioner, 
section 14 of the Health and Safety at Work etc. Act 1974, and before that the Offshore Installations (Public Inquiries) Regulations 1974, 
sections 6872 of the Financial Services Act 2012,  
the Merchant Shipping Act 1995,  
regulation 16(13) of the Civil Aviation (Investigation of Accidents) Regulations 1969, and 
schedule 1 of the Coroners and Justice Act 2009, which enables non-statutory inquests to be converted into statutory inquiries under the Inquiries Act 2005.

 Public local inquiries
A Public Local Inquiry is an inquiry led by the independent Planning Inspectorate, for various local issues involving a local planning authority. They follow formal rules and procedures, and they could include a planning application which has been refused permission, in which case it is called a Planning Inquiry, or an appeal against a compulsory purchase order, which are called a Compulsory Purchase Order Inquiry, or listed building consent appeals, which are called a Listed Building Inquiry. These types of inquiries may last for up to several days, or even weeks. Inquiries are usually held in local planning authority offices, village halls or community centres. One example of a Public Local Inquiry was the inquiry into the M4 Corridor around Newport Project in Wales, which followed The Highways (Inquiries Procedure) Rules 1994 and The Compulsory Purchase (Inquiries Procedure) (Wales) Rules 2010. 
This list excludes public local inquiries due to the numerous inquiries involved.

 The rules for public local inquiries throughout the United Kingdom

The Drought Orders (Inquiries Procedure) Rules 1984
The Highways (Inquiries Procedure) Rules 1994
The Public Libraries (Inquiries Procedure) Rules 1992
The Road Humps (Secretary of State) (Inquiries Procedure) Rules 1986

 The rules for public local inquiries in England and Wales

The Town and Country Planning (Inquiries Procedure) (England) Rules 2000
The Rights of Way (Hearings and Inquiries Procedure) (England) Rules 2007
The Electricity Generating Stations and Overhead Lines (Inquiries Procedure) (England and Wales) Rules 2007
The Transport and Works (Inquiries Procedure) Rules 2004
The Pipe-lines (Inquiries Procedure) Rules 1995
The Town and Country Planning (Inquiries Procedure) (Wales) Rules 2003
The Compulsory Purchase (Inquiries Procedure) Rules 2007
The Compulsory Purchase (Inquiries Procedure) (Wales) Rules 2010
The Electricity (Offshore Generating Stations) (Inquiries Procedure) (Wales) Regulations 2019

 The rules for public local inquiries in Scotland 
The Town and Country Planning (Inquiries Procedure) (Scotland) Rules 1997
The Compulsory Purchase by Public Authorities (Inquiries Procedure) (Scotland) Rules 1998
The Fatal Accidents and Sudden Deaths Inquiry Procedure (Scotland) Rules 1977
The Transport and Works (Scotland) Act 2007 (Inquiries and Hearings Procedure) Rules 2007

 The rules for public local inquiries in Northern Ireland 
The Health and Safety Inquiries (Procedure) Regulations (Northern Ireland) 1980
Planning (Inquiry Procedure) Rules (Northern Ireland) 2015
The Agricultural Marketing (Public Inquiry) Regulations (Northern Ireland) 1984

Statutory public inquiries

Public inquiries under the Inquiries Act 2005

Current public inquiries

Former public inquiries

Public inquiries under the Tribunals of Inquiry (Evidence) Act 1921

Public inquiries under subject-specific legislation

Non-statutory public inquiries

'Ad-hoc' public inquiries

Current 'ad-hoc' public inquiries

Former 'ad-hoc' public inquiries

Independent panels

Current independent panels

Former independent panels

Royal Commissions

The last royal commission was established during the Blair government in 1999, when he established the Royal Commission on the Reform of the House of Lords.

Ad hoc Committees of Privy Counsellors

Ad hoc committees are made up of members of the Privy Council as they can be informed on ‘Privy Council Terms’, which allows members of the committees to be informed on the understanding that any secret information provided will remain confidential.

See also
Inquests in England and Wales
Fatal accident inquiry (Scotland)

Notes

References

External links
A Guide to Public Inquiries
Inquiries Guidance - Guidance for Inquiries Chairs and Secretaries, and Sponsor Departments
National Audit Office investigation into government-funded inquiries

Public inquiries
United Kingdom